Gabriel Wiethaeuper-Balbinotti (born April 12, 1998) is a Canadian professional soccer player.

Early life 
Born in Montreal, Quebec to Brazilian parents, Balbinotti spent the early years of his childhood in Porto Alegre, Brazil, where he attended Pan American School. He moved to Kirkland, Quebec when he was eight years old and played for the Hudson Saint-Lazare soccer club. He then moved to Trois-Rivières, Quebec four years later. He settled in Montreal to join the Montreal Impact Academy in 2012.

College career
In 2019, he began attending the Université du Québec à Trois-Rivières, playing for the UQTR Patriotes men's soccer team. In 2019, he helped them to win the U Sports men's soccer championship, scoring three goals during the final tournament.

Club career 

Balbinotti progressed through the youth ranks of MLS club Montreal Impact. At the 2014 MLS All-Star Game, he played for the youth all-star team against the Bayern Munich U16s. In 2015, he joined the Under-18 squad competing in the U.S. Soccer Development Academy. He scored three goals in 21 games in his debut season, before adding 23 goals in as many games during the 2016–17 campaign.

On February 28, 2018, Balbinotti joined USL side Ottawa Fury. After the 2018 season, the Fury would announce that Balbinotti would not return to the Fury for the 2019 season.

In May 2019, Balbinotti joined PLSQ team FC Lanaudière. In his first season in the PLSQ, he scored six goals in 10 appearances.

In December 2019, Balbinotti was drafted seventh overall in the 2019 CPL–U Sports Draft by Forge FC. On July 31, 2020 he signed a deal with Forge FC.

He returned to the PLSQ and FC Lanaudière in 2021. For the 2022 season, he signed with Celtix du Haut-Richelieu.

International career 
In 2013, Balbinotti was called up to two camps with the Canadian U-15 national team. He was named to the U15 national team for the 2013 Copa de México de Naciones. In January 2018, he was called up to the Canadian U-23 national team camp in the United States for the first time.

In 2017, he was called up to a Quebec-Canada U20 team to play friendlies against Haiti U20, who were preparing for the 2017 Jeux de la Francophonie.

Career statistics

References

External links 
 
 

1998 births
Living people
Association football forwards
Canadian people of Brazilian descent
Canadian Premier League players
Canadian soccer players
Forge FC draft picks
Forge FC players
CF Montréal players
Ottawa Fury FC players
Première ligue de soccer du Québec players
Soccer players from Montreal
Footballers from Porto Alegre
University and college soccer players in Canada
USL Championship players
FC Lanaudière players
Celtix du Haut-Richelieu players
21st-century Canadian people